Aleksandr Vauchetskiy (born 13 July 1985) is a Belarusian sprint canoeist who has been competing since 2005. He has won seven medals at the ICF Canoe Sprint World Championships with four golds (C-4 200 m: 2009, C-4 500 m: 2006, C-4 1000 m: 2009, 2010), two silvers (C-4 200 m: 2006, C-4 500 m: 2005), and one bronze (C-4 200 m: 2007).

External links
Canoe09.ca profile 

1985 births
Belarusian male canoeists
Living people
ICF Canoe Sprint World Championships medalists in Canadian